The spotted amphisbaena (Cadea blanoides) is a species of amphisbaenian in the family Cadeidae. This species is endemic to the island of Cuba.

References

 Stejneger, 1916: Notes on amphisbaenian nomenclature. Proceedings of the Biological Society of Washington, Vol. 29, p. 85 (full text).

blanoides
Reptiles of Cuba
Endemic fauna of Cuba
Reptiles described in 1916
Taxa named by Leonhard Stejneger